Water Talkies are devices which makes talking underwater possible. They were invented by Richie Stachowski, Jr. in 1995 at age 11.

What started as one product turned into a company producing water toys "made by a kid for kids" - a line of eight pool toys.

Rich Stachowski won the 1999 Entrepreneur of the Year Award (the youngest ever) for this invention.

Indigate 
Megaphone

References

American inventions
Audio amplifiers
1990s toys
Water toys